Raffles Place Park is a park in Singapore.

Transportation
The park is situated above Raffles Place MRT station.

See also
 List of Parks in Singapore
 National Parks Board

References

External links
 National Parks Board, Singapore

Parks in Singapore